Dorval is an on-island city on the Island of Montreal, Quebec, Canada.

Dorval may also refer to:

People
 Marie Dorval (1798-1849), French actress
 Onésime Dorval (1845-1932), the first certified teacher in Saskatchewan, Canada
 Napoléon Dorval (1878-1955), Canadian hockey coach
 Dorval (footballer) (1935-2021), Dorval Rodrigues, Brazilian footballer
 Alain Dorval (born 1946), French voice actor
 Monferrier Dorval (1956-2020), Haitian jurist
 Anne Dorval (born 1960), Canadian actress
 Deck Dorval, pseudonym for Frans van Dooren, Jef Beeckmans, and Jos Deckkers for books published in Esperanto

Places
 Dorval International Airport, alternate name for Montréal–Trudeau International Airport, airport in Dorval, Canada
 L'Île-Dorval, city in Quebec, Canada
 Dorval–L'Île-Dorval, former borough in Quebec, Canada that split into Dorval and L'Île-Dorval
 Dorval—Lachine—LaSalle, federal election district in Quebec, Canada
 Dorval River, tributary of the Sanguenay river, in Quebec, Canada
 Dorval-Jean-XXIII, high school in Dorval, Montreal
 Dorval station (Via Rail), via rail in Dorval, Montreal
 Dorval station (Exo), intermodal and commuter rail station in Dorval, Canada